This is a list of characters in the Hong Kong television series Born Rich.

Cast

Cheuk Family

Sha Family

Tung Family

Tai Family

Cosmo Bank Corporation

Other Cast

Lists of Hong Kong television series characters
Lists of drama television characters